Pamela Vivien Kirkham, 16th Baroness Berners ( Williams; 30 September 1929 – 23 January 2023) was a British hereditary peer who worked as a nurse in the National Health Service. She was a member of the House of Lords from 1995 to 1999.

Family and career
Born in Gloucestershire, she was the elder daughter of Vera Ruby Tyrwhitt, 15th Baroness Berners, and Harold Williams JP. She was educated at Stonar School and Radcliffe Infirmary in Oxford, where she qualified as a State Registered Nurse in 1951, thereafter working in the National Health Service.

In 1952 she married Captain Michael Kirkham, an officer in the Derbyshire Yeomanry. They had three children.

Peerage and succession
Upon her mother's death in 1992, the ancient Berners barony by writ of summons fell into abeyance between Pamela and her younger sister, Rosemary, the wife of Kelvin Pollock FCA). As is customary in such uncontested cases, the HoL Committee of Privileges terminated the abeyance in favour of the elder daughter. Pamela succeeded her mother as Lady Berners in 1995. She joined the Conservative benches in the House of Lords, where she sat until 1999, speaking about health and nursing matters.

Berners died from a stroke on 23 January 2023, at the age of 93. Her title passed to her elder son, Rupert William Tyrwhitt Kirkham, who on 12 February 1994 had married Lisa Lipsey, daughter of the decorated United States Air Force pilot, Colonel Edward Lipsey.

See also
 Ashwellthorpe
 John Radcliffe Hospital
 Baron Berners

Arms

References

External links
www.burkespeerage.com
Who's Who 2015
www.debretts.com

1929 births
2023 deaths
People from Gloucestershire
People educated at Stonar School
Conservative Party (UK) hereditary peers
Hereditary women peers
English nurses
Pamela
16
Berners